John Charles Lee was an English footballer who played in the Football League for Clapton Orient as an outside left.

Personal life 
Lee served as a private in the British Army during the First World War.

References

English footballers
English Football League players
Leyton Orient F.C. players
Association football wing halves
Year of death missing
British Army personnel of World War I
1889 births
People from Morpeth, Northumberland
Footballers from Northumberland
Morpeth Town A.F.C. players
Exeter City F.C. players
Southern Football League players
Newcastle United F.C. players
Military personnel from Northumberland
British Army soldiers